Alman may refer to:
 Alman-e Qadim, East Azerbaijan Province
 Alman, Rasht, Gilan Province
 Alman, Khoshk-e Bijar, Rasht County, Gilan Province
 Alman, alternate name of Pastak, Rasht County, Gilan Province